VLF transmitter Lualualei is a facility of the United States Navy near Lualualei, Hawaii transmitting orders to submerged submarines in the very low frequency (VLF) range.

Description 
VLF transmitter Lualualei, which operates under the callsign NPM on 21.4 kHz and 23.4 kHz.

The station's current antenna was built in 1972; it consists of two guyed masts, each 458.11 metres (1503 feet) tall, which are configured as umbrella antennas. They are fed by an overhead cable, fixed to a tall mast at one end, and at the opposite end to a smaller grounded mast near the helix building via an insulator.

At the time they were built, they were the tallest towers used for military purposes in the Western hemisphere. The two masts are also the tallest towers used for long wave transmissions in the Western hemisphere. Since the collapse of Warsaw Radio Mast, they may be the world's tallest structures that are electrically insulated from the ground.

See also
 VLF Transmitter Cutler
 Jim Creek Naval Radio Station
 Naval Communication Station Harold E. Holt
 List of masts

Sources

External links
 
 Entry at Wikimapia
 ,  Entries at Skyscraperpage
 Frequency list ( search there for Lualualei )

Communications and electronic installations of the United States Navy
Installations of the United States Navy in Hawaii
Military radio systems
Towers in Hawaii
Buildings and structures in Honolulu County, Hawaii
Radio masts and towers in the United States
Towers completed in 1972
1972 establishments in Hawaii